Francesco Karkalis (born 19 January 1995) is an Italian football player.

Club career
He made his Serie C debut for L'Aquila on 11 October 2014 in a game against Lucchese.

On 19 November 2019 he signed with Serie C club Bisceglie.

On 4 January 2021 he joined Arezzo.

Personal life
Born in Italy, Karkalis is of Greek descent through his father with roots from Thessaloniki.

References

External links
 

1995 births
Sportspeople from Pescara
Living people
Italian footballers
Italian people of Greek descent
Association football defenders
Delfino Pescara 1936 players
L'Aquila Calcio 1927 players
S.S. Teramo Calcio players
Bassano Virtus 55 S.T. players
Carrarese Calcio players
A.S. Bisceglie Calcio 1913 players
S.S. Arezzo players
Serie C players
Footballers from Abruzzo